This is a list of the main career statistics of New Zealand former tennis player Anthony Wilding  (1883–1915) whose amateur career spanned from the beginning of the 20th century until the outbreak of World War I. Wilding won six Grand Slam singles titles, including four Wimbledon Championships. In addition he won the World Hard Court Championships and World Covered Court Championships. As a member of the Australasia team he won the  Davis Cup in 1907, 1908, 1909 and 1914.

Performance timeline

Events with a challenge round: (WC) won; (CR) lost the challenge round; (FA) all comers' finalist

Grand Slam finals

Singles: (6 titles, 1 runner-up)

Doubles: (5 titles)

Mixed Doubles: (1 runner-ups)

World Championships finals

In 1913 the International Lawn Tennis Federation (ILTF) designated Wimbledon as the official World Grass Championship together with the World Hard Court Championships and World Covered Court Championships. This lasted until 1923 when the current Grand Slam tournaments were designated as 'Official Championships'.

Singles: (3 titles)

Doubles: (1 runner-up)

Mixed doubles: (1 runner-up)

Singles titles

Davis Cup 
Between 1905 and 1914 Wilding played in 11 ties for the Australasia team in the Davis Cup and won 21 out of 30  matches; 15 of his 21 singles matches and 6 out of 9 doubles. He was a member of the victorious teams in 1907, 1908, 1909 and 1914.

Notes

References

Sources
 
 
 

Wilding, Tony